Haptoclinus is a genus of labrisomid blennies native to the Caribbean Sea.

Species
There are currently two recognized species in this genus:
 Haptoclinus apectolophus J. E. Böhlke & C. R. Robins, 1974 (Uncombed blenny)
 Haptoclinus dropi C. C. Baldwin & D. R. Robertson, 2013 (Four-fin blenny)

References

 
Labrisomidae
Fish of the Caribbean